The DakotaDome is an indoor multi-purpose stadium in the north central United States, located on the campus of the University of South Dakota in Vermillion, South Dakota. Opened  in 1979 at a cost of $8.2 million, the 9,100-seat venue is the home of the South Dakota Coyotes for football, swimming and diving, and track and field.

The DakotaDome was also the home site for the NAIA school Briar Cliff University football team from 2013 until 2017, when they re-located 25 miles to the southeast to Sioux City, Iowa, which is where their campus is located.

The Dome hosts other events throughout the year, including the high school football state championships each November. In 2014, a proposal for a new basketball arena went through and construction began just south of the Dome. The new arena, the Sanford Coyote Sports Center, which seats 6,000, opened in the fall of 2016 for volleyball, preceding the 2016–17 basketball season.

Originally an air-supported structure, numerous roof collapses led to it being replaced by a $13.7 million steel roof in 2001. In early 2019, construction to rebuild the interior of the west side of the stadium began. The project cost was approximately $26.3 million and was completed in 2020.

See also
 List of NCAA Division I FCS football stadiums

References

American football venues in South Dakota
Athletics (track and field) venues in South Dakota
Basketball venues in South Dakota
College football venues
College indoor track and field venues in the United States
College swimming venues in the United States
College volleyball venues in the United States
Defunct college basketball venues in the United States
Covered stadiums in the United States
Indoor track and field venues in the United States
South Dakota Coyotes football
South Dakota Coyotes men's basketball
Buildings and structures in Vermillion, South Dakota
Tourist attractions in Clay County, South Dakota
Sports venues in South Dakota
Multi-purpose stadiums in the United States
1979 establishments in South Dakota
Sports venues completed in 1979